Flyte was a chocolate bar manufactured by Mars, Incorporated weighing 45 grams. The product was introduced in 1996.

Each bar came wrapped in two individual halves. It consisted of a chocolatey, whipped nougat-style centre coated in milk chocolate. It was essentially the same as a UK Milky Way bar before the filling in Milky Way bars was changed from chocolate to vanilla flavour in 1993.

The bar was discontinued in 2015.

Nutritional information

References

British confectionery
Chocolate bars
Mars confectionery brands